Ante Vican (11 June 1926 – 20 March 2014) was a Croatian actor. He appeared in more than thirty films from 1969 to 2012.

Selected filmography

References

External links 

1926 births
2014 deaths
Croatian male film actors